Greg Weber (born 15 April 1950) is a Canadian former professional soccer player who earned 2 caps for the Canadian national side in 1973. He played club football for the Vancouver Whitecaps.

Weber was voted the Pacific Coast League's MVP in 1970.

International career
Weber made his debut for Canada in an August 1973 friendly match against the United States and earned his second and final cap against Luxembourg in October 1973.

References

External links
 
 NASL career stats

1950 births
Living people
Soccer players from Winnipeg
Association football goalkeepers
Canadian soccer players
Canada men's international soccer players
Vancouver Whitecaps (1974–1984) players
North American Soccer League (1968–1984) players
North American Soccer League (1968–1984) indoor players
UBC Thunderbirds soccer players